Roundabout was a small settlement located west of St. Lawrence near Lawn.

See also
 List of communities in Newfoundland and Labrador

Ghost towns in Newfoundland and Labrador